Joseph Andy Lui (born January 7, 1992) is a sprinter from Tonga. He came 4th in Heat 1 of the 100 metres Preliminaries at the 2012 Summer Olympics.

Lui was born in Tofoa.

References

External links
 

1992 births
Living people
Tongan male sprinters
Athletes (track and field) at the 2012 Summer Olympics
Olympic athletes of Tonga
People from Tongatapu
21st-century Tongan people